Anisomeles ajugacea is a species of flowering plant in the family Lamiaceae and is endemic to Queensland. It is a low-lying shrub with egg-shaped to heart-shaped stem-leaves with a gradual transition to flora bracts on the upper part of the stem, and small groups of pink flowers.

Description

Taxonomy
This species was first formally described in 1888 by Frederick Manson Bailey and Ferdinand von Mueller who gave it the name Teucrium ajugaceum. In 2015, Anthony Bean changed the name to Anisomeles ajugacea in the journal Austrobaileya.
 
For many years, the species was thought to be extinct, until it was rediscovered on Cape York, between Cooktown and Lockhart River in May 2004. Previous to this, the species had not been seen since 1891.

Distribution and habitat
Anisomelea ajugacea grows on low rises and flats in woodland within a  radius of Musgrave on the Cape York Peninsula of Queensland.

Conservation status
This species is listed as of "least concern" under the Queensland Government Nature Conservation Act 1992.

References

ajugacea
Lamiales of Australia
Flora of Queensland
Plants described in 1888
Taxa named by Ferdinand von Mueller
Taxa named by Frederick Manson Bailey